The third season of the American science fiction television series Fringe began airing on the Fox network on September 23, 2010, and concluded on May 6, 2011. Twenty-two episodes long, the season was produced by Bad Robot Productions in association with Warner Bros. Television, and its showrunners were Jeff Pinkner and J.H. Wyman. Lead actors Anna Torv, John Noble, and Joshua Jackson reprised their roles as FBI agent Olivia Dunham and the father-son duo Walter and Peter Bishop. Previous series regulars Lance Reddick, Jasika Nicole, and Blair Brown also returned, along with recurring guest stars Kirk Acevedo, Seth Gabel, and Ryan McDonald.

Building off the finale from the previous season, Fringes third season dealt with a war between the prime and parallel universes. During the first part of the season, odd-numbered episodes mostly took place in the parallel universe and have a red title sequence, while even-numbered episodes mostly took place in the prime universe and have the original blue title sequence. In episode eight, "Entrada", the title sequence is a mixture of blue and red to signify the universal focus of the episode. In the rest of the season, however, the episodes focus on the prime universe with brief shifts to the parallel universe. 

Wyman and Pinkner saw Fringe as two shows, where they could provide a detailed mythology that was equally compelling in both universes. Eager to explore "what-if" moments, historical idiosyncrasies and other differences were inserted to help disambiguate the two worlds. Much of the season was designed around a doomsday device, as they believed its mysteriousness was "a great story engine for us." The nineteenth episode, "Lysergic Acid Diethylamide", contained long sequences of animation in order to accommodate guest actor Leonard Nimoy's retirement from acting. While the writers had attempted to continue the idea of the "mythalone" for both casual and devoted fans, Fringe mythology became more visible in the last episodes of the season. Equating the final three episodes to a chapter in a novel, the writers "linked [them] in one continuous story arc."

The third season was positively received by television critics, and it earned 77 out of 100 on the aggregate review website Metacritic, indicating critical reception as "generally favorable." Reviewers reacted well to the exploration of the parallel universe, and the performances of Torv and Noble, who each played differing versions of their original characters, were lauded. Fringe ended its third season with an average of 5.83 million viewers per episode, placing 99th for the network television season. The New York Times called the series "the best major-network show that no one is watching." Despite its low ratings, Fox renewed the series for a fourth season on March 24, 2011.

Season summary 
Following Peter's rescue from the parallel universe, the prime universe Fringe team comes to learn of the Wave Sink Device, the machine that Walternate was attempting to use to destroy the prime universe. They are unaware that Fauxlivia has replaced Olivia, and she works to help the Fringe Division to identify the components hidden across the globe for a similar Wave Form Device in the prime universe.  She also gets romantically close to Peter.

Olivia is held in Walternate's laboratories in the parallel universe, and given drugs and conditioning to make her believe she is Fauxlivia, and subsequently a willing test subject for Walternate's tests of the powers of Cortexiphan. Olivia slowly breaks this conditioning, and on one trial, is able to cross over to the prime universe to relay a warning to Peter about Fauxlivia. Her identity exposed, Fauxlivia is extracted back to the parallel universe by Walternate's shapeshifters, while Olivia gets help from Broyles to cross back to the prime universe. Olivia is distraught after her return, knowing about Peter's relationship with Fauxlivia. However, after some time, the two reconcile and admit they have feelings for each other.  

In the prime universe, the Fringe team learn more of the Wave Sink Device from Sam Weiss, understanding it was created by a long-advanced race known as the First People, with the power to destroy or create universes, but is only powered by Peter's biology. The two devices in both universes are quantumly entangled, allowing one to alter the other universe. Walter surmises that Walternate wants to engage the device to destroy the prime universe in hopes of healing the parallel universe damaged by his crossing in 1985.  In the parallel universe, Walternate discovers Fauxlivia is pregnant with Peter's child and discreetly accelerates the pregnancy, as to obtain a sample of the child's blood to activate the Device. The effects on the prime universe are numerous but the parallel universe shows no sign of healing. Walter directs teams to move the prime universe Device to Liberty Island, the same location where the parallel device, as to minimize the affected areas, and then instructs Peter to use the device to counteract the parallel version. Instead, when Peter enters the device, he witnesses a future where the parallel universe was destroyed and the prime universe on verge of the same collapse, and finds that Walter would set a plan in motion to send the Device back into the far past via a wormhole (creating the First People myth), and having it trigger this memory when Peter uses it. After this experience, Peter uses the device to link the two together, fusing the two rooms from the prime and parallel universe into a bridge, allowing the two sides to meet one another. However, shortly after this, Peter disappears to the apparent obliviousness of both Fringe teams; the Observers, looking on, note that September was correct; they do not remember him. September simply states, "How could they? He never existed. He served his purpose."

Episodes

Production

Crew
Fringe is produced by Bad Robot Productions in association with Warner Bros. Television. Co-creator J. J. Abrams continued to work as executive producer along with fellow co-creators Alex Kurtzman and Roberto Orci, who returned as consulting producers. Bryan Burk and Joe Chappelle also returned as executive producers, while Akiva Goldsman worked as consulting producer. Executive producers Jeff Pinkner and J.H. Wyman continued in their role as showrunners for the third season, which involved overseeing every episode and sometimes directly contributing episode scripts. As with every season, they laid out the third season's storyline a year in advance.

Writing and filming
The season finale of the second season introduced the parallel universe to viewers. Fringes producers debated over how much of this universe to depict in the third season, but ultimately decided that showing the doppelgangers would "fit more into our own character’s lives and show different aspects of their personalities". As a result, Fringe began its third season by alternating between episodes, with each depicting one universe. The Fox network was initially resistant to this design, as executives were "really concerned that if the episodes didn't have ['over here'] Walter or Peter in them, it wouldn’t feel like our show anymore." Jeff Pinkner and J.H. Wyman explained that the series had to constantly evolve, "otherwise we’ll get bored, the cast will get bored, the audience will get bored"; after the first several episodes of the season, Fox agreed it was a positive change.

The producers saw the season as "two shows"; Wyman noted, "It's on us to make the mythology over there just as compelling as the mythology here, so we will enjoy both of them. We have our characters going back and forth, there or here, but there's a whole set of nice characters that you'll become very interested in very quickly. It's interesting because it gives you that gearshift." Wyman later added that parallel universe plot device "really allowed us to explore the characters deeper via their doppelgängers, to illuminate characters we already know. It’s been a real gas for all of us involved in making the show." Historical idiosyncrasies were inserted into the parallel universe, such as a still-living John F. Kennedy, the non-existence of the FBI, and the Back to the Future franchise starring Eric Stoltz rather than Michael J. Fox. The writers loved creating an entire new world, and asked themselves what life would have been like in its most mundane forms, such as within daily routines. Pinkner thought it allowed them to create and explore many "what-if" moments, such as if the September 11 attacks had occurred against the White House instead of the Twin Towers, or if the Statue of Liberty still possessed its shiny copper sheen. "Entrada", the eighth episode, was the first of the season to divide its time between both universes.

Many of the episodes involved the discovery and construction of a doomsday device, which Pinkner believed to be "a good thing to design a season around" because its mysteriousness was "a great story engine for us." While the writers tried to maintain the concept of the "mythalone," a storyline that was attractive to both casual and devoted Fringe fans, the series became more invested in its mythology towards the end of the third season. "Lysergic Acid Diethylamide", the season's nineteenth episode, was the first of the series to contain sequences of animation. While previous guest actor Leonard Nimoy had retired, the writers still had storylines involving his character, William Bell. They were able to record his voice, and consequently worked with Zoic Studios to develop the episode. This unorthodox storytelling device was consistent with the nineteenth episodes of other seasons, including "Brown Betty" and "Letters of Transit".

The final three episodes of the season were "linked in one continuous story arc," and meant to seem like "you're turning the last page of a chapter in a novel. And usually in a good novel, the last pages [of a chapter] compels you forward with a new understanding of what the subject matter is and you get deeper and you can’t wait to turn that page." The crew wrote the finale before the season was officially renewed, but deigned to leave it unchanged once discovering that a fourth season had been approved. Pinkner explained that "we wrote the episode, perhaps foolishly, assuming that we would be on for Season 4. We never for one second entertained that it would be the end of the series. So therefore, we didn't have to change a word!" The finale was designed to establish the groundwork by "open[ing] a new chapter" for the new season, which included Peter having never existed. Its futuristic storyline was meant to "inform the present of the show with some thematic elements," establishing to viewers that "our world is going to break down."

Different title sequences were inputted to help disambiguate the two universes, as well as establish other versions of their world. Blue and red represented the prime and parallel universes, respectively while "Entrada" featured a mixture of blue and red in its title sequence. An episode set in 1985 began with a retro title sequence, and the finale's version of the title sequence was silver-gray and black. Each opening credit sequence contained specific words that were meant to serve as "signposts" for both current and future episodes, such as the finale sequences' use of "thought extraction" and "dual maternity". Like the previous season, the third season was filmed in Vancouver. Because of its heritage buildings and antique storefronts, many of the scenes set in the alternate universe were shot in New Westminster, an area outside Vancouver. Filming of the live action parts of "Lysergic Acid Diethylamide" were shot along west Hastings Street. Executive producer Joe Chappelle returned to direct five episodes, while producer Brad Anderson was responsible for directing four. Other new and returning directors included Thomas Yatsko, Jeffrey Hunt, Kenneth Fink, David Straiton, Frederick E. O. Toye, Chuck Russell, and Charles Beeson;  they each directed one episode. In addition, Dennis Smith and Jeannot Szwarc each directed two episodes.

Cast

Main cast 

Most of the series' main cast returned for the third season. Anna Torv portrayed two versions of Olivia Dunham, each from their own universe, while Joshua Jackson returned as her love interest, Peter Bishop, and John Noble played Peter's father, Dr. Walter Bishop. Lance Reddick starred as FBI agent Phillip Broyles, and Jasika Nicole played junior FBI agent/Walter's lab assistant Astrid Farnsworth. Lastly, Blair Brown returned as Massive Dynamic executive Nina Sharp.

Recurring cast 
Michael Cerveris depicted September/The Observer in every episode of the season, while Eugene Lipinski played another Observer, December, for two episodes. Seth Gabel and Kirk Acevedo returned as parallel universe Fringe agents Lincoln Lee (10 episodes) and Charlie Francis (6 episodes), respectively. The parallel universe also featured Andre Royo as Henry Higgins, Amy Madigan as Marilyn Dunham, and Philip Winchester as Frank Stanton, all for three episodes. Ryan McDonald played two versions of Brandon Fayette for twelve episodes, and Orla Brady guest starred as Elizabeth Bishop for one episode. Sebastian Roché returned from the second season to play one of the season's antagonists Thomas Jerome Newton for two episodes, along with Gerard Plunkett as Senator Van Horn. Kevin Corrigan depicted Samuel Weiss for three episodes, Karen Holness played Diane Broyles for two, Clark Middleton played Edward Markham and J. R. Bourne played Agent Edwards, each for one episode.

The season featured single episodes with special guest appearances by Christopher Lloyd as Roscoe Joyce, Jorge Garcia as Massive Dynamic security guard Kevin, Paula Malcomson as Dana Gray, Emily Meade as Ella Dunham, Brad Dourif as Moreau, and Leonard Nimoy as William Bell.

Reception

Ratings and broadcast
Fringes second season ended with an average of 6.252 million viewers per episode and a 2.3 ratings share for adults 18–49, causing the series to finish in 79th place out of all the season's network television shows. Despite its middling ratings, Fringe received a full third season renewal on March 6, 2010.

At the beginning of the 2010–11 United States network television schedule, Fringe remained in its Thursday timeslot for the first nine episodes of the third season, where it faced tough competition from the high-rated Grey's Anatomy and CSI: Crime Scene Investigation. The season premiere aired on September 23, 2010 to 5.83 million viewers in the United States, earning a 2.1 rating for viewers 18–49. This was thirty percent down from the previous season's premiere, "A New Day in the Old Town". On its initial broadcast on November 4, the fifth episode hit a then-season low of 1.8/5 in the adult demographic. Fox moved Fringe to a new Friday night timeslot on January 21, 2011, where it typically broadcast opposite Supernatural, Dateline NBC, and CSI: NY. Because of the night's "death slot" status, this move made television critics and fans nervous that Fringe was near cancellation. For the first few episodes in its new timeslot, its ratings remained consistent with previous Thursday episodes, but soon began to drop.

There were some positive aspects of the third season's ratings however. Among adults aged 18 to 49, Fringe placed first in its Friday timeslot. Total viewers, as well as the ratings share for adults and teenagers, surpassed Fox's average for that same timeslot. Furthermore, the average household income of Fringes adult viewers was higher than the total U.S. adult population average, and its adult viewers also had a higher index of having four or more years of college. Despite its low ratings, Fringe was officially renewed for a fourth season on March 24, 2011 to the surprise of observers – six days before the renewal, Fringe had reached a new series ratings low. The renewal came in the wake of campaigns conducted by Fringe actors, fans of the series, and television critics. Kevin Reilly, Fox's entertainment president, commented that "the series' ingenious producers, amazingly talented cast and crew, as well as some of the most passionate and loyal fans on the planet, made this fourth-season pickup possible."

Fringe ended its third season with an average of 5.83 million viewers per episode, finishing in 99th place for the American network television season. Time shifted viewing played a significant part in Fringes third season ratings. According to a report released by Nielsen Company, Fringe was the only network television series among the top ten of most time-shifted shows of 2011. The report continued that time shifting increased the series' overall audience by eighty percent.

Reviews
On Rotten Tomatoes, the season has an approval rating of 100% with an average score of 7.2 out of 10 based on 13 reviews. The website's critical consensus reads, "With more mysteries to uncover and mind-bending plot devices, season three of Fringe further cements the show's status as one of the best science fictions shows on television." Aggregate review site Metacritic gave the third season 77 out of 100 based on six critical reviews, indicating the critical reception was "generally favorable". Critic Josh Wigler, writing for Comic Book Resources, lauded the season's first two episodes, explaining "For the third season of the critically acclaimed Fox series, executive producers and co-showrunners Jeff Pinkner and J.H. Wyman have responded to their audience's demands by creating a new kind of episode: the mythalone, designed to propel the story and characters forward while still keeping the show accessible to new viewers on a weekly basis... it's nothing short of amazing that the new mythalone approach to Fringe works wonders, if only in the first two episodes of the new season." 

After watching the first three episodes, Aaron Riccio of Slant Magazine also praised the new season, writing "The plots have generally been the "fringe" of Fringe; the meat has been in the characters' developing feelings for one another. Now the two are not only on equal footing, but they're both firing on full cylinders... Afraid, perhaps, to toy with viewers the way that Lost did, Fringe keeps the action moving, rapidly unspooling its mysteries, and that decision proves to be a wise one. Rather than waiting for a future payoff, Fringe is cashing in with every episode, showing us the escalating war between worlds—and with likeable characters and compelling cases to boot. Ironically, it's by branching out in two different directions that the show has become, more than ever, the centerpiece of a hypercompetitive Thursday night lineup." 

In December 2010, the New York Times wrote Fringe "has kept its plates spinning entertainingly well into its third season" and called it "the best major-network show that no one is watching". Because of its "ultra-daring" and "bold" storylines, IGN gave Fringe their award for "Best Sci-Fi Series" in 2010. They noted, "With stellar performances, sci-fi intrigue and a newly introduced Doomsday machine in play that almost guarantees the two worlds will face off Thunderdome-style, this series just keeps getting better and better." For 2011, Fringe third season helped the show place sixth on Digital Spy's top 25 television shows of the year, which described the season as "exemplary". Similarly, The A.V. Club named Fringe the sixteenth best television series of 2011, in particular highlighting "Lysergic Acid Diethylamide" and "The Firefly".

As the third season involved doppelgangers of known characters, specific actors were selected for praise from critics. Lead actress Anna Torv was lauded from multiple quarters for portraying two Olivias, one from each universe. Critics were more divided about her performance as William Bell (Leonard Nimoy), with some praising it and others remaining undecided or critical. John Noble's performances as Walter Bishop and his doppelganger "Walternate" received positive recognition from critics, with one noting he was "astonishing me with every performance." Specific episodes that were isolated for praise among critics included "Entrada", "Subject 13", and "The Day We Died". "Lysergic Acid Diethylamide" was lauded for its risky premise.

In her 2011 book Into the Looking Glass: Exploring the Worlds of Fringe, author Sarah Clarke Stuart noted that the third season's "apocalyptic nature was fitting for an audience in the midst of such seemingly world-ending economic turmoil in 2010–2011." To Clarke Stuart, Walter's remark in the episode "6B" that the world is tearing apart reflected "the sentiments of American viewers who were facing job loss and displacement at an unprecedented level."

Awards and nominations

For the 1st Critics' Choice Television Awards, it was nominated for Best Drama Series and Anna Torv was nominated for Best Actress in Drama Series. John Noble won for Best Supporting Actor in Drama Series. At Entertainment Weeklys annual viewer-voted EWwy awards, Fringe won for Best Drama, while Torv won for Best Actress in a Drama. Fringe won accolades at the 37th Saturn Awards for Best Network Television Series, Best Actress in Television for Torv, and Best Supporting Actor in Television for Noble.

Home video releases
The third season of Fringe was released on Blu-ray and DVD in region 1 on September 6, 2011, in region 2 on September 26, 2011 and in region 4 on October 26, 2011. The sets includes all 22 episodes of season three on a 4-disc Blu-ray set and a 6-disc DVD presented in anamorphic widescreen. Special features include two commentary tracks—"The Plateau" with Monica Owusu-Breen, Jeff Pinkner and Timothy Good, and "Lysergic Acid Diethylamide" with Jay Worth, Luyen Vu, and Tanya Swerling. Behind-the-scenes featurettes include "Duality of Worlds", a four-part featurette, exploring The Other You, Visualizing an Alternate World, A Machine of Destiny and The Psychology of Duality. Other featurettes include "Animating the 'Lysergic Acid Diethylamide' Episode", "Constructing an Extrasensory Soundscape" and "Experience 'Os' (Episode 316) in Selectable Maximum Episode Mode with Pop-Up Experience-Enhancing Commentaries and Featurettes. Also included are a gag reel and trailers. Exclusive to the Blu-ray release is a featurette titled "Glimmer to the Other Side".

References

External links 

 
 

3
2010 American television seasons
2011 American television seasons